Tuomas Iisalo (born 29 July 1982) is a Finnish basketball coach and former player. He currently is the head coach of the Telekom Baskets Bonn. He also played for the Finnish national basketball team.

Coaching career
After the end of his playing career he was appointed as head coach of Tapiolan Honka and was an assistant with Finland U15. In March 2016, he signed with Crailsheim Merlins. With the team, he won promotion from the ProA to the Basketball Bundesliga.

In the 2017–18 season, Crailsheim was promoted to the Bundesliga once again as the ProA season's runners-up. Iisalo managed to establish the club in the Bundesliga and in 2020-21 guided the Merlins to their first ever Bundesliga playoff berth. In May 2021, he inked a two-year deal with fellow Bundesliga side Telekom Baskets Bonn.

References

Living people
1982 births
Crailsheim Merlins coaches
Espoon Honka players
Finnish basketball coaches
Finnish men's basketball players
Kouvot players
Shooting guards
Sportspeople from Helsinki
Tapiolan Honka coaches
Torpan Pojat players